Fel or FEL may refer to:

 Fel, a commune in France
 Foundation for Endangered Languages, a charity supporting threatened languages around the world
 FEL lamp
 Free-electron laser
 Front-end loader
 Front-end loading
 Front End Loader, an Australian rock band
 Feltham railway station, in London
 Marie Fel (1713–1794), French opera singer
 Tomášov, a village and municipality in Slovakia